C' Chartres Métropole Handball is a handball club from Chartres, France. Currently, the team competes in the French First League of Handball.

Crest, colours, supporters

Naming history

Kit manufacturers

Kits

Sports Hall information

Name: – Halle Jean-Cochet
City: – Chartres
Capacity: – 1200
Address: – 6 Rue Jean Monnet, 28000 Chartres, France

Team

Current squad
Squad for the 2022–23 season

Goalkeepers
1  Nebojša Grahovac
 31  Julien Meyer
 44  Zoran Radic
Left Wingers
3  Vanja Ilić
 96  Gaël Tribillon
Right Wingers
6  Morten Vium
 19  Svetlin Dimitrov
Line players
7  Adrià Figueras
 69  Hugo Jund

Left Backs
 20  Ilija Abutović
 95  Vadim Gayduchenko
 97  Yvan Verin
Central Backs
8  Aleksa Kolaković
 18  Sergey Kudinov
Right Backs
9  Yanis Busselier
 14  Matic Grošelj
 33  Sergiy Onufriyenko

Transfers
Transfers for the 2023–24 season

 Joining
  Milan Bomastar (GK) (from  IFK Skövde)

 Leaving 
  Julien Meyer (GK) (to  Kadetten Schaffhausen)

Former club members

Notable former players

  Maxime Cherblanc (2008-2016)
  Grégoire Detrez (2017–2018)
  Samuel Foucault (2009-2016)
  Julien Meyer (2021-)
  Quentin Minel (2006-2009)
  Robin Molinié (2012-2019)
  Sébastien Mongin (2012–2015)
  Alric Monnier (2008-2017)
  Zacharia N'Diaye (2015-2021)
  Sébastien Ostertag (2012-2015)
  Émeric Paillasson (2011-2016)
  Yohann Ploquin (2015-2016)
  Valentin Porte (2006-2008)
  Raoul Prandi (2003-2009)
  Yacinn Bouakaz (2011–2014)
  Edin Bašić (2017-2018)
  Nebojša Grahovac (2013-)
  Leonardo Domenech de Almeida (2019–2021)
  Alexis Bertrand (2010–2011)
  Rodrigo Salinas Muñoz (2016-2017)
  Kim Sonne-Hansen (2019-2021)
  Aurélien Tchitombi (2018–2020)
  Adrià Figueras (2021-)
  Ghennadii Solomon (2007-2014)
  Dan Racoțea (2019-2020)
  Sergey Kudinov (2014-)
  Alexander Pyshkin (2015–2016)
  Matic Grošelj (2021-)
  Borut Oslak (2013-2016)
  Davor Čutura (2015-2016)
  Saša Mitrović (2006-2014)
  Lukáš Urban (2020-2021)
  Mourad Khabir (2005-2013)
  Wael Jallouz (2019-2020)
  Can Çelebi (2015–2016)
  Sergiy Onufriyenko (2018-)

Former coaches

References

External links 

  
 

French handball clubs
Chartres